Strontium iodide (SrI2) is a salt of strontium and iodine.  It is an ionic, water-soluble, and deliquescent compound that can be used in medicine as a substitute for potassium iodide 
.
It is also used as a scintillation gamma radiation detector, typically doped with europium, due to its optical clarity, relatively high density, high effective atomic number (Z=48), and high scintillation light yield. In recent years, europium-doped strontium iodide (SrI2:Eu2+) has emerged as a promising scintillation material for gamma-ray spectroscopy with extremely high light yield and proportional response, exceeding that of the widely used high performance commercial scintillator LaBr3:Ce3+. Large diameter SrI2 crystals can be grown reliably using vertical Bridgman technique  and are being commercialized by several companies.

Reactions
Strontium iodide can be prepared by reacting strontium carbonate with hydroiodic acid:
SrCO3  +   2 HI  →  SrI2  +  H2O + CO2

Strontium iodide forms a white powder that slowly changes to a yellowish colour when exposed to air. At high temperatures (in the presence of air) strontium iodide completely decomposes to form strontium oxide and free iodine.

References

Iodides
Strontium compounds
Alkaline earth metal halides